The 1932 DePaul Blue Demons football team was an American football team that represented DePaul University as an independent during the 1932 college football season. The team compiled a 5–1–2 record and outscored opponents by a total of 96 to 34. Jim Kelly and Ben Connor were the team's coaches.

Schedule

References

DePaul
DePaul Blue Demons football seasons
DePaul Blue Demons football